Glomangiosarcoma is a low grade tumor of the soft tissue. They rarely metastasize, but metastases are possible. It is also known as "malignant glomus tumor". Positive staining for vimentin has been reported.

See also
 angiosarcoma
 Glomus tumor#Malignant glomus tumors

References

External links 

Dermal and subcutaneous growths
Types of neoplasia